Rossella Muroni (born 8 October 1974) is an Italian environmentalist and politician.

Early life 
She graduated in Sociology. From 1994 to 1996 she was part of the Student Union as the national manager of the student's legal office of Italian General Confederation of Labour.

Career 
In 1996 she joined the environmentalist association Legambiente where she initially worked in the press office. From 2002 to 2007, she served as national manager of information campaigns. She became the spokesperson for the Legambiente campaign sector and took care of the main information and awareness activities of the association, giving contributions to association publications including: the Italian Environment Report, the Ecomafia dossier, the Blue Guide, the Urban Ecosystem Report and drafting information leaflets and brochures on environmental issues.

In 2007 she became general director of the association and in 2015 was elected national president of Legambiente. On December 2017, she left her office in order to run for the 2018 political elections with the left-wing coalition Free and Equal and was elected deputy.

References

External links 
Files about her parliamentary activities (in Italian): XVIII legislature.

1974 births
Living people
Politicians from Rome
21st-century Italian politicians
Sapienza University of Rome alumni